The Weatherfords (also Weatherford Quartet and Weatherford Trio) is an American southern gospel music vocal group.

The Weatherfords were formed by husband and wife Earl Weatherford and Lily Weatherford, who began singing together in the mid-1940s in Long Beach, California, after their marriage in 1944. Earl had founded the group prior to this as an all-male troupe, and Lily began filling in on the tenor parts in 1948, eventually becoming the group's most visible member. They moved several times over the next few decades, to Fort Wayne, Indiana, Akron, Ohio, Fontana and Sacramento, California (as part of the staff of Calvary Temple), and Paoli, Oklahoma.

The group sang on California radio stations (KFOX- KBGR-KBIG ) in the 1940s, and was offered a full-time spot on radio station WOWO in Fort Wayne, Indiana, in 1949. In the 1950s, they recorded for RCA Victor. In 1959, The quartet's In The Garden album for RCA was produced by Chet Atkins, and also featured guitar work by Atkins. It was recorded in Nashville at RCAs Studio B. They also worked in collaboration with evangelist Rex Humbard between 1953 and 1963. The group's other key members at this time were Glen Payne, Armond Morales, and Henry Slaughter.

The Weatherfords departed Akron, Ohio, for California in 1963, and the groups The Cathedrals and The Imperials were formed from members of the Weatherfords at this time as well. 

Other notable members included Dallas Holm, whose time with the group was short due to his draft requirements during the Vietnam War; Jim Hammel, who went on to be a long-time member of the Kingmens Quartet; David Engles, who now owns and operates a radio network out of Tulsa, Oklahoma (KNYD); and Dave Roland (Dave & Sugar).

The Weatherfords were featured on Greystone Productions: The History Of Southern Gospel Music, that was featured on many PBS stations in the mid 1990s, as well as several of the early editions of the Gaither Homecoming Videos. 

Earl Weatherford died in 1992. In 1999, Lily published an autobiography, With All My Heart. She performed with the Weatherfords and retired in June 2013. Earl and Lily Weatherford were inducted into the Southern Gospel Museum and Hall of Fame in 2000.

Steve Weatherford is still touring nationally doing upwards of 150 concerts per year.

Members

It is believed the Weatherfords may hold the record for having the most members in a Gospel music group having had over 100 in a 70-year period.

Members have included: 
Earl Weatherford (1922–92): alternated on baritone and lead 1944–1992
Lily Fern Goble Weatherford (b. 1928): alto 1945, 1948–1961, 1963–2013
Steven Earl Weatherford: 1976–present
Les Roberson: lead 1948–1955
James Hamill: lead 19??–1956  The link is NOT to the James Hamill of the Kingsmen. 
George Younce: bass 19??–1956
Armond Morales (b. 1932): bass 1948–1964
Glen Payne (1926–99): lead 1957–1963
James Hopkins: tenor 1961
Henry Slaughter (1927–2020): piano 19??–1963
James Clark: piano 1964–1966
Billy Brisendine: lead 19??–1966
Tracy Dartt (b. 1944): bass 19??–1973
Fulton Nash: bass 19??–1973
James Holbrook: piano 197?–197?
Haskell Cooley: piano 1972–1974
Glenn Couch (b. 1935): 1966
Bob Thacker: bass 19??–1966
Steve Weatherford: lead 1976–present
Cody Boyer: baritone 2007–2010
Terry Robertson: 2010
Foster Smith: 1946 or 47??
Kelley Looper: Baritone 2000-2006?

References

Ivan M. Tribe, The Weatherfords. Encyclopedia of American Gospel Music. Routledge, 2005, p. 420.

1940s establishments in California
Family musical groups
American gospel musical groups
Gospel quartets
Musical groups established in the 1940s
Southern gospel performers